The 2023 Women's Bandy World Championship (officially the 2023 Bandy World Championship) will be played in Åby, a subdivision of Växjö City in Sweden between women's national bandy teams. The competition takes place from 28 March – 2 April 2023. It is hoped that this tournament will also mark the Ukrainian national women's bandy team's world debut as scheduled. In 2022, the Ukraine squad was forced to withdraw from the 2022 Women's Bandy World Championship due to the Russian invasion of Ukraine.

This world championship for women's international bandy marks a departure in the sport whereas in the past, organizers traditionally hosted the men's and women's international competitions separately, but this season will see both tournaments held at the same time and in the same venue. The tournament will crown the world champions for the Women's Bandy World Championship and the men's Bandy World Championship.

Venue
All matches will be played in Eriksson Arena, Åby.

Competing nations 
 Sweden
 Finland
 USA
 Netherlands
 Ukraine
 Switzerland

References

Bandy World Championships
World Championships
Women's Bandy World Championship
World
Bandy
2023 in Swedish sport
International bandy competitions hosted by Sweden
Bandy
Bandy World Championship
Bandy World Championship
Sports events affected by the 2022 Russian invasion of Ukraine